Rupert Scholz (born 23 May 1937) is a German politician of the Christian Democratic Union.

Early life and education
Scholz was born in Berlin and received his Abitur in 1957. He studied law and economic at the Free University of Berlin the Ludwig Maximilian University of Munich. He completed his first Staatsexamen in 1961, received his doctorate in 1966 with Peter Lerche as Doktorvater in Munich with the work Das Wesen und die Entwicklung der gemeindlichen öffentlichen Einrichtungen, completed his second Staatsexamen in 1967 and habilitated in 1971 in Munich with the work Die Koalitionsfreiheit als Verfassungsproblem. In 1972 he became a law professor at the Free University of Berlin. In 1978 he accepted the chair of state, administrative and finance law at the University of Munich. He retired from the post in 2005.

Political career
From 1981 to 1983, Scholz was Senator for Justice under Berlin Governing Mayor Richard von Weizsäcker and Senator for Federal Affairs under Weizsäcker and his successor Eberhard Diepgen from 1982 to 1988. Scholz joined the Christian Democratic Union of Germany (CDU) in 1983. From 1985 to 1988 he was a member of the Abgeordnetenhaus of Berlin. From 1990 to 2002 he was a member of the Bundestag and Chairman of the CDU/CSU parliamentary group from 1994 to 1998. From 1998 to 2002 he was chairman of the Legal Committee. From 1998 to 2001 he was Deputy State Chairman of the CDU Berlin. In the 2002 German federal election he was passed over in his constituency (Berlin-Tempelhof) by his party against his will.

Defence Minister
On 18 May 1988, Scholz was appointed Federal Minister of Defence in the cabinet of Chancellor Helmut Kohl. Gerhard Stoltenberg succeeded him in the post in the cabinet reshuffle in 1989.

In 2007, Scholz stated that Germany should strive to become a nuclear power.

References

1937 births
Living people
Academic staff of the Ludwig Maximilian University of Munich
Defence ministers of Germany
Members of the Bundestag for Berlin
Members of the Bundestag 1998–2002
Members of the Bundestag 1994–1998
Senators of Berlin
Members of the Bundestag for the Christian Democratic Union of Germany